A gate tower is a tower built over or next to a major gateway.

Usually it is part of a medieval fortification. This may be a town or city wall, fortress, castle or castle chapel. The gate tower may be built as a twin tower on either side of an entranceway. Even in the design of modern building complexes, gate towers may be constructed symbolically as a main entrance. The gate tower can also stand as a twin tower on both sides of a gate system. Gate towers are also used symbolically as the main entrance in the design of modern building complexes. The Kasselburg in Rhineland-Palatinate has a double tower gate tower, which was also used as a residential tower.

Gallery

See also 
 Tower
 Gate
 Gatehouse
 City gate
 Triumphal arch
 Fortified gateway

References

External links 

Fortified towers by type
Types of gates
Castle architecture